is Japan's highest order. The Grand Cordon of the Order was established in 1876 by Emperor Meiji of Japan; the Collar of the Order was added on 4 January 1888. Unlike its European counterparts, the order may be conferred posthumously.

Apart from the Imperial Family, only seven Japanese citizens have ever been decorated with the collar in their lifetimes; the last such award was to former Prime Minister Saionji Kinmochi in 1928. Eight others have been posthumously decorated with the collar; the last such award was to former Prime Minister Shinzo Abe in 2022. Today, only the reigning Emperor holds this dignity as sovereign of the order; however, exceptions are made for foreign heads of state, who can be awarded the collar in friendship.

The grand cordon is the highest possible honour a Japanese citizen can be awarded during his or her lifetime. Aside from members of the Imperial Family, 53 Japanese citizens have been decorated with the grand cordon; of these, only 23 were living at the time of receipt.

Insignia
The collar of the order is made of gold, and features the kanji for "Meiji", in classic form, indicating the era of the order's establishment. It is decorated with gold chrysanthemum blossoms and green-enamelled leaves.

The sash of the grand cordon of the order is red with dark blue border stripes. It is worn on the right shoulder.

The star of the order is similar to the badge, but in silver, without the chrysanthemum suspension, and with an eight-pointed gilt medallion (with white-enamelled rays and red-enamelled sun disc) placed at the centre. It is worn on the left chest.

The badge of the order is a four-pointed gilt badge with white-enamelled rays; the centre bears a red enamelled sun disc. On each of the four corners of the badge is a yellow-enamelled chrysanthemum blossom with green-enamelled chrysanthemum leaves. The badge is suspended on a yellow-enamelled chrysanthemum, either on the collar or on the grand cordon.

Grades

Sovereigns

Emperor Meiji (Sovereign from 27 December 1876)
Emperor Taishō (Grand Cordon 3 November 1889; Collar 10 May 1900; Sovereign from 30 July 1912)
Emperor Shōwa (Grand Cordon 9 September 1912; Collar as Regent 24 September 1921; Sovereign from 25 December 1926)
Emperor Akihito (Grand Cordon 10 November 1952; Sovereign from 7 January 1989 to 30 April 2019)
Emperor Naruhito (Grand Cordon 23 February 1980; Sovereign since 1 May 2019)

Awards of the Collar of the Order of the Chrysanthemum to members of the Imperial Family and royalty

Awards made to imperial princes while living
Prince Komatsu Akihito (5 August 1895)
Prince Fushimi Sadanaru (19 January 1916)
Prince Kan'in Kotohito (24 September 1921)
Prince Fushimi Hiroyasu (29 April 1934)
Prince Nashimoto Morimasa (29 April 1940)

Posthumous awards to imperial princes
Prince Arisugawa Taruhito (16 January 1895)
Prince Kitashirakawa Yoshihisa (1 November 1895)
Prince Arisugawa Takehito (7 July 1913)
Prince Higashifushimi Yorihito (27 June 1922)
Prince Kuniyoshi Kuni (27 January 1929)

Posthumous award to foreign royalty
Gojong of the Korean Empire (21 January 1919)

Awards of the Grand Cordon of the Order of the Chrysanthemum to members of the Imperial Family and royalty

Awards made to imperial princes while living
Prince Arisugawa Taruhito (2 November 1877)
Prince Komatsu Akihito (7 December 1882)
Prince Arisugawa Takahito (24 January 1886)
Prince Kitashirakawa Yoshihisa (29 December 1886)
Prince Arisugawa Takehito (29 December 1886)
Prince Kuni Asahiko (29 December 1886)
Prince Fushimi Sadanaru (29 December 1886)
Prince Yamashina Akira (29 December 1886)
Prince Kan'in Kotohito (18 August 1887)
Prince Higashifushimi Yorihito (15 July 1889)
Prince Kaya Kuninori (3 November 1903)
Prince Kuni Kuniyoshi (3 November 1903)
Prince Yamashina Kikumaro (3 November 1903)
Prince Nashimoto Morimasa (3 November 1904)
Prince Fushimi Hiroyasu (3 November 1905)
Prince Arisugawa Tanehito (4 April 1908)
Prince Takeda Tsunehisa (31 October 1913)
Prince Asaka Yasuhiko (31 October 1917)
Prince Kuni Taka (31 October 1917)
Prince Kitashirakawa Naruhisa (31 October 1917)
Prince Higashikuni Naruhiko (31 October 1917)
Prince Chichibu (25 October 1922)
Prince Kachō Hirotada (19 March 1924)
Prince Takamatsu (1 February 1925)
Prince Fushimi Hiroyoshi (3 November 1928)
Prince Kaya Tsunenori (7 December 1930)
Prince Kuni Asaakira (25 May 1932)
Prince Kan'in Haruhito (3 November 1934)
Prince Mikasa (1 October 1936)
Prince Takeda Tsuneyoshi (3 November 1940)
Prince Asaka Takahiko (7 November 1940)
Prince Hitachi (28 November 1955)
Prince Tomohito of Mikasa (5 January 1966)
Prince Katsura (27 February 1968)
Prince Takamado (29 December 1974)
Crown Prince Naruhito (23 February 1980)
Prince Akishino (30 November 1985)

Posthumous awards to imperial princes
Prince Kitashirakawa Nagahisa (4 September 1940)

Awards to foreign royalty
Prince Yi Un of Korea (27 April 1920)
Prince Yi Kang of Korea (8 January 1924)
Prince Yi Geon of Korea (3 November 1926)
Prince Yi Wu of Korea (7 November 1943)
King Charles III of the United Kingdom (5 October 1971)
Sultan Haji Hassanal Bolkiah Mu'izzaddin Waddaulah of Brunei (April 1984)
King Birendra of Nepal (1975)
Crown Prince Dipendra of Nepal (12 April 2001)

Ordinary awards of the Collar of the Order of the Chrysanthemum

Awards made to living individuals
Itō Hirobumi (1 April 1906)
Ōyama Iwao (1 April 1906)
Yamagata Aritomo (1 April 1906)
Katsura Tarō (10 October 1913)
Matsukata Masayoshi (14 July 1916)
Tōgō Heihachirō (11 November 1926)
Saionji Kinmochi (10 November 1928)

Posthumous awards
Inoue Kaoru (1 September 1915)
Tokudaiji Sanetsune (4 June 1919)
Ōkuma Shigenobu (10 January 1922)
Yamamoto Gonbee (9 December 1933)
Shigeru Yoshida (20 October 1967)
Eisaku Satō (3 June 1975)
Yasuhiro Nakasone (29 November 2019)
Shinzō Abe (11 July 2022)*
* :  Awarded with the Grand Cordon

Ordinary awards of the Grand Cordon of the Order of the Chrysanthemum

Awards made to living recipients

Sanjō Sanetomi (11 April 1882)
Iwakura Tomomi (1 November 1882)
Shimazu Hisamitsu (5 November 1887)
Nakayama Tadayasu (14 May 1888)
Itō Hirobumi (5 August 1895)*
Kujō Michitaka (10 May 1900)
Ōyama Iwao (3 June 1902)*
Saigō Tsugumichi (3 June 1902)
Yamagata Aritomo (3 June 1902)*
Inoue Kaoru (1 April 1906)⁑
Katsura Tarō (1 April 1906)⁑
Tōgō Heihachirō (1 April 1906)*
Tokudaiji Sanetsune (1 April 1906)⁑
Matsukata Masayoshi (1 April 1906)*
Nozu Michitsura (6 October 1908)
Itō Sukeyuki (10 November 1913)
Ōkuma Shigenobu (14 July 1916)⁑
Saionji Kinmochi (21 December 1918)*
Ye Wanyong, (February 1926)
Oku Yasukata (10 November 1928)
Yamamoto Gonbee (10 November 1928)⁑
Shigeru Yoshida (29 April 1964)⁑
Eisaku Satō (3 November 1972)⁑
Yasuhiro Nakasone (29 April 1997)⁑
* :  Later awarded the Collar
⁑ : Posthumously awarded the Collar

Posthumous awards

Kuroda Kiyotaka (25 August 1900)
Terauchi Masatake (3 November 1919)
Hara Takashi (4 November 1921)
Kabayama Sukenori (8 February 1922)
Katō Tomosaburō (24 August 1923)
Hasegawa Yoshimichi (28 January 1924)
Katō Takaaki (28 January 1926)
Kawamura Kageaki (28 April 1926)
Inoue Yoshika (22 March 1929)
Uehara Yūsaku (8 November 1933)
Saitō Makoto (26 February 1936)
Takahashi Korekiyo (26 February 1936)
Tokugawa Iesato (5 June 1940)
Kaneko Kentarō (16 May 1942)
Kiyoura Keigo (5 November 1942)
Isoroku Yamamoto (18 April 1943)
Ichiki Kitokurō (17 December 1944)
Ichirō Hatoyama (7 March 1959)
Hayato Ikeda (13 August 1965)
Kōtarō Tanaka (1 March 1974)
Masayoshi Ōhira (12 June 1980)
Nobusuke Kishi (7 August 1987)
Takeo Miki (14 November 1988)
Takeo Fukuda (5 July 1995)
Keizō Obuchi (14 May 2000)
Noboru Takeshita (19 June 2000)
Zenkō Suzuki (19 July 2004)
Ryūtarō Hashimoto (1 July 2006)
Toshiki Kaifu (9 January 2022)
Shinzō Abe (11 July 2022)*
* :  Awarded with the Collar

Foreign recipients of the Order of the Chrysanthemum

Collar
 Henri, Grand Duke of Luxembourg, 2017
 Willem-Alexander, King of the Netherlands, 2014
 Margrethe II, Queen of Denmark
 Harald V, King of Norway
 Carl XVI Gustav, King of Sweden
 Albert II, King of the Belgians, 1996
 Philippe, King of the Belgians, 2016
 Mohammed VI, King of Morocco, 2005
 Abdullah II, King of Jordan, 1999
 Tuanku Syed Sirajuddin, King of Malaysia, 2005
 Hassanal Bolkiah, Sultan of Brunei, 1984
 Jigme Singye Wangchuck, King of Bhutan, 1987
 Juan Carlos I, King of Spain, 1980
 Felipe VI, King of Spain, 2017
 Salman bin Abdulaziz Al Saud, King of Saudi Arabia, 2017
 Tarja Halonen, President of Finland

Grand Cordon
 Charles III, King of the United Kingdom
 Victoria, Crown Princess of Sweden
 Frederik, Crown Prince of Denmark
 Prince Joachim of Denmark
 Vajiralongkorn, King of Thailand
 Willem-Alexander, King of the Netherlands
 Norodom Sihamoni, King of Cambodia, 2010
 Philippe, King of the Belgians
 François Hollande, President of France
 Toomas Hendrik Ilves, President of Estonia
 Valdas Adamkus, President of Lithuania
 Aleksander Kwaśniewski, President of Poland
 Vaira Vīķe-Freiberga, President of Latvia
 Gloria Macapagal Arroyo, President of the Philippines
 Nursultan Nazarbayev, President of Kazakhstan
 Mauricio Macri, President of Argentina
 Fernando Henrique Cardoso, President of Brazil
 Haakon, Crown Prince of Norway
 Beatrix of the Netherlands

Collar (deceased) 

 Edward VII, King of the United Kingdom and Emperor of India (1841–1910)
 George V, King of the United Kingdom and Emperor of India (1865–1936)
 Wilhelm II, Emperor of Germany (1859–1941)
 Franz Joseph I, Emperor of Austria-Hungary (1830–1916)
 Victor Emmanuel III, King of Italy (1869–1947)
 Leopold II, King of Belgium (1835–1909)
 Emperor Gojong of Korea (1852–1919)
 Emperor Sunjong of Korea (1874–1926)
 Tuanku Syed Putra, King of Malaysia (1920–2000)
 Haile Selassie I, Emperor of Ethiopia (1892–1974)
 Sultan Ismail Nasiruddin Shah, King of Malaysia (1906–1979)
 Sultan Abdul Halim, King of Malaysia (1970–2017)
 Alfonso XIII, King of Spain (1886–1941)
 Dwight D. Eisenhower, President of the United States (1890–1969)
 Ernesto Geisel, President of Brazil (1907–1996)
 Sultan Azlan Shah, Yang di-Pertuan Agong (king) of Malaysia (1928–2014)
 Birendra, King of Nepal (1945–2001)
 Mahendra, King of Nepal (1920–1972)
 George Tupou V, King of Tonga (1948–2012)
 Suharto, President of Indonesia (1921–2008)
 Muhammad Zahir Shah, King of Afghanistan (1914–2007)
 Fuad I, King of Egypt and the Sudan (1868–1936)
 Faruk I, King of Egypt and the Sudan (1920–1965)
 Hussein I, King of Jordan (1935–1999)
 Norodom Sihanouk, King of Cambodia (1922–2012) 1968
 Jaber Al-Ahmad Al-Jaber Al-Sabah, Emir of Kuwait (1926–2006)
 Muhammad Reza Pahlavi, Shah (Emperor) of Iran (1919–1980)
 Abdul Hamid II, Sultan of the Ottoman Empire, 1887 (1842–1912)
 Bhumibol Adulyadej, King of Thailand (1946–2016)
 Khalifa bin Hamad Al Thani, Emir of Qatar, 1984 (1932–2016)
 Sabah Al-Ahmad Al-Jaber Al-Sabah, Emir of Kuwait, 2012 (1929-2020)
 Elizabeth II, Queen of the United Kingdom, 1962 (1926-2022)
 Christian X of Denmark, (1870–1947)
 Frederick IX of Denmark, (1899–1972)
 Haakon VII of Norway, (1872–1957)
 Olav V of Norway, (1903–1991)
 Tāufaʻāhau Tupou IV of Tonga, (1918–2006)
 Gustaf VI Adolf of Sweden, (1882–1973)
 Nicholas II of Russia, (1868–1918)

Grand Cordon (deceased)

 Abdul Hamid II, Sultan of the Ottoman Empire (1842–1918)
 Archduke Franz Ferdinand of Austria, Crown Prince of the Austro Hungarian Empire (1863–1914)
 Luitpold, Prince Regent of Bavaria (1821–1912)
 Prince Arthur of Connaught (1883–1938)
 Guangxu Emperor of Qing dynasty China (1871–1908)
 Wang Jingwei, President of the Wang Jingwei regime, December 1942
 Aishwarya, Queen consort of Nepal (1949–2001)
 Dipendra, Crown Prince of Nepal (1971–2001)
 Prince Henry, Duke of Gloucester (1900–1974)
 Sukarno, President of Indonesia (1901–1970)
 Soeharto, President of Indonesia (1921–2008)
 Sadi Carnot, President of France (1837–1894)
 Benito Mussolini, Prime Minister of Italy (1883–1945)
 Porfirio Díaz, President of Mexico (1830–1915)
 Álvaro Obregón, President of Mexico (1880–1928)
 Prajadhipok, King of Siam (1893–1941)
 Puyi, Emperor of Manchukuo (1906–1967)
 Ronald Reagan, President of the United States (1911–2004)
 Samuel Robinson (1870–1958)
 Juscelino Kubitschek, President of Brazil (1902–1976)
 Ferdinand Marcos, President of the Philippines (1917–1989) Honor awarded 1966 --]
 Amha Selassie I, Emperor of Ethiopia (1916–1997)
 Prince Imperial Makonnen of Ethiopia (1923–1957)
 Prince Imperial Sahle Selassie of Ethiopia (1931–1962)
 Norodom Suramarit, King of Cambodia (1896–1960)
 Josip Broz Tito, President of Yugoslavia (1892–1980)
 Prince Imperial Uihwa of Korea (1877–1955)
 Crown Prince Vong Savang of Laos (1931–1978?)
 Crown Prince Euimin of Korea (1897–1970)
 Todor Zhivkov of the People's Republic of Bulgaria  (1911–1998)
 David Kalākaua, King of Hawaii (1836–1891)
Chulalongkorn, King of Siam (1853–1910)
 Qaboos, Sultan of Oman (1940–2020)
 Hosni Mubarak, President of Egypt (1928-2020)
 Prince Philip, Duke of Edinburgh, Prince consort of the United Kingdom (1921–2021)
 Benigno Aquino III, President of the Philippines (1960–2021)
 Elizabeth II, Queen of the United Kingdom, 1962 (1926-2022)
 Alexander II of Russia (1818-1881)
 Alexander III of Russia (1845-1894)
 Nicholas II of Russia (1868–1918)
 Grand Duke Vladimir Alexandrovich of Russia (1847-1909)
 Grand Duke Alexei Alexandrovich of Russia (1850-1908)
 Grand Duke Sergei Alexandrovich of Russia (1857-1905)
 Grand Duke Konstantin Konstantinovich of Russia (1858-1915)
 Grand Duke George Alexandrovich of Russia (1871-1899)
 Grand Duke Kirill Vladimirovich of Russia (1876-1938)
 Grand Duke Michael Alexandrovich of Russia (1878-1918)
 Alfonso XII of Spain (1857-1885)
 William I, German Emperor (1797-1888)
 Frederick III, German Emperor (1831-1888)
 Prince Henry of Prussia (1862–1929)
 Prince Friedrich Leopold of Prussia (1865–1931)
 Wilhelm, German Crown Prince (1882-1951)
 Prince Eitel Friedrich of Prussia (1883-1942)
 Prince Adalbert of Prussia (1884–1948)
 Prince Waldemar of Prussia (1889–1945)
 Albert of Saxony (1828-1902)
 George, King of Saxony (1832-1904)
 William II of Württemberg (1848-1921)
 Rupprecht, Crown Prince of Bavaria (1869-1955)
 Prince Georg of Bavaria (1880-1943)
 Frederick I, Grand Duke of Baden (1826-1907)
 Charles Alexander, Grand Duke of Saxe-Weimar-Eisenach (1818-1901)
 Charles Augustus, Hereditary Grand Duke of Saxe-Weimar-Eisenach (1844–1894)
 Frederick Francis III, Grand Duke of Mecklenburg-Schwerin (1851-1897)
 Duke John Albert of Mecklenburg (1857-1920)
 Ernest II, Duke of Saxe-Coburg and Gotha (1818-1893)
 Prince Leopold Clement of Saxe-Coburg and Gotha (1878-1916)
 Bernhard III, Duke of Saxe-Meiningen (1851-1928)
 Prince Karl Anton of Hohenzollern (1868-1919)
 Otto von Bismarck (1815-1898)
 Miklós Horthy (1868-1957)
 Christian IX of Denmark (1818-1906)
 Frederick VIII of Denmark (1843-1912)
 Prince Valdemar of Denmark (1858-1939)
 Henrik, Prince Consort of Denmark (1934-2018)
 Prince George of Greece and Denmark (1869-1957)
 Oscar II of Sweden]] (1829-1907)
 Gustaf V of Sweden]] (1858-1950)
 Prince Oscar Bernadotte (1859-1953)
 Prince Bertil, Duke of Halland (1912-1997)
 William III of the Netherlands (1817-1890)
 Duke Henry of Mecklenburg-Schwerin (1876-1934)
 Prince Claus of the Netherlands (1926-2002)
 Jean, Grand Duke of Luxembourg (1921-2019)
 Luís I of Portugal (1838-1889)
 Carlos I of Portugal (1863-1908)
 Manuel II of Portugal (1889-1932)
 Luís Filipe, Prince Royal of Portugal (1887-1908)
 Émile Loubet (1838-1929)
 Boutros Boutros-Ghali (1922-2016)
 Rudolf, Crown Prince of Austria (1858-1889)
 Archduke Ferdinand Karl of Austria (1868-1915)
 Diosdado Macapagal (1910-1997)
 Corazon Aquino (1933-2009)
 Arturo Frondizi (1908-1995)
 Zine El Abidine Ben Ali (1936-2019)
 Vajiravudh of Siam (1881-1925)
 Umberto I of Italy (1844-1900)
 Amadeo I of Spain (1845-1890)
 Prince Tommaso, Duke of Genoa (1854-1931)
 Prince Luigi Amedeo, Duke of the Abruzzi (1873-1933)
 Nicholas I of Montenegro (1841-1921)
 Prince Philippe, Count of Flanders (1837-1905)
 Prince Arthur, Duke of Connaught and Strathearn (1850-1942)
 Prince Himalaya of Nepal (1921-1980)

See also 
Order of the Rajamitrabhorn (Thailand)
Order of the Royal House of Chakri (Thailand)
Grand Order of Mugunghwa (ROK)
Order of the Garter (UK)
Order of Merit of the Federal Republic of Germany (Grand Cross special class and special issue equivalents)
Decoration of Honour for Services to the Republic of Austria (Grand Star)
Order of St. Andrew (Russia)
Order of the Golden Fleece (Spain)
Order of the Tower and Sword (Portugal; Grand Collar and Grand Cross)
 Order of Merit of the Italian Republic (Grand Cross with Collar equivalent)

Notes

References

Citations

Sources 
 Peterson, James W., Barry C. Weaver and Michael A. Quigley. (2001). Orders and Medals of Japan and Associated States. San Ramon, California: Orders and Medals Society of America. ; .
Congrats to Him: PM Modi's Message for Dr Manmohan Singh,  NDTV.com, .

External links 

 Japan, Cabinet Office: Decorations and Medals
 Decoration Bureau: Supreme Order of the Chrysanthemum
 Japan Mint: Production Process

Chrysanthemum, Order of the
Empire of Japan
Awards established in 1876
Chrysanthemum, Order of the
1876 establishments in Japan